Burridge is a village in the Borough of Fareham, southern Hampshire, England.

Burridge may also refer to:

 Burridge (surname)
 Burbidge baronets, a title in the Baronetage of the United Kingdom
 Burridge Fort, an Iron Age hilltop fortification north-east of Barnstaple, Devon, England

See also
 Burr (surname)
 Burr Ridge, Illinois